Goodbye, Spaceblade is the second album by Sywnthkrawft. The process of making the album has been troublesome because the band couldn't find a producer to the album. Also it was during the first sessions the guitarist, Daniel Thyberg, left the group. The album was in planning as late as the late summer of 2006. Most of the album was recorded during some sessions in the autumn of 2006 and in the spring of 2007. Some piano versions of the songs from the album were recorded during a live event in Mora, Minnesota, United States and one of these songs were released on the first single from the album. Also as a result of the trip William got inspired to write three tracks featured on the album. The album release got postponed many times, but finally it was released in April 2007. Some songs from the album were performed live in November 2007 and were later released on the live-bootleg Tuxedo Junction.

On 8 March 2007, the first single from the album, "The Photographer's Exceptional Pictures for Body and Mind", debuted on #1 in the Swedish chart Dalatoppen. The next single "Mademoiselle Musicale" was supposed to be released in June 2007 but was later cancelled. During their summer vacation in 2007 William re-recorded all the songs on the album. These re-recordings will be for sale as the Goodbye, Spaceblade album instead of the old one.

Outtakes
Some outtakes are known from two recording session (one in the autumn of 2006 and the spring of 2007) these are:

Autumn 2006 sessions:
 Saguaroxx (This song was rehearsed to a concert in the autumn of 2006. But the concert never took place)
 The Day Jolly Roger Came To Town (two versions exists, one with vocals and one without)
 Rings of Saturn (two versions exists, one from the 2006 sessions and a remake from the 2007 sessions)
 Paul Newman (this song is a remake from the original outtake from Cornea)

Spring 2007 sessions:
 Erecto Plasma (the only song from Goodbye, Spaceblade sessions who was co-written by Daniel Thyberg)
 Die Endlose Sternreise (never commercially released, not circulating)
 Halloween Never Ends (the first song co-written by keyboardist Gustav Jacobsson, might be released later according to sources)

Track listing
All songs by William Johansson

"The Photographer's Exceptional Pictures for Body and Mind" - 02:55
"Main Road" - 02:48
"Goodbye, Spaceblade" - 03:45
"The Reason to Love when the Good Ol' Times are Dying" - 01:39
"Princess on Ice" - 02:00
"Mr.Riviera '55, I Presume" - 01:30
"When the Clarinetist saw a Lunar Eclipse" - 01:43
"Mademoiselle Musicale" - 03:12
"The Dream of Amerikat 1845" - 01:51
"Gagarin's Last Letters to Earth" - 03:10
"Highway" - 04:29
"Your Eyes Are Sparkling Like Shining Stars" - 05:46
"Narcissistic Domination" - 02:29

Re-recorded release 
"The Photographer's Exceptional Pictures for Body and Mind"
"Main Road"
"Goodbye, Spaceblade"
"The Reason to Love when the Good Ol' Times are Dying"
"Princess on Ice"
"Mr.Riviera '55, I Presume"
"When the Clarinetist saw a Lunar Eclipse"
"Mademoiselle Musicale"
"The Dream of Amerikat 1845"
"Gagarin's Last Letters to Earth"
"Highway"
"Your Eyes Are Sparkling Like Shining Stars"
"Narcissistic Domination"

Singles 
"The Photographer's Exceptional Pictures for Body and Mind" (12 November 2006)
"Mademoiselle Musicale" (Cancelled)

Credits
William Johansson - Synthesizers
Viktor Jacobsson - Synthesizers
Gustav Jacobsson - Synthesizers

Produced by Peter Bayer, Marcus Källgren & William Johansson

Recorded at William Production Studios, Borlänge
Mixed at Studiobros, Växsjö & in Borlänge

Cover: William Johansson
Design: William Johansson

Re-recorded release Credits
William Johansson - Synthesizers
Viktor Jacobsson - Synthesizers
Gustav Jacobsson - Synthesizers

Produced by William Johansson

Recorded at William Production Studios, Borlänge
Mixed at William Production Studios, Borlänge

Cover: William Johansson
Design: William Johansson

Special Thanks to: Magnus Berg, Marcus Källgren, Peter Bayer, Daniel Olsson, Elsa & Hans Villius

2007 albums
Sywnthkrawft albums